Sorbarieae is a tribe of the rose family, Rosaceae, belonging to the subfamily Amygdaloideae.

References

External links 

 
Rosales tribes